Andrés Alejandro Hernández Hernández (born 21 April 1993) is a Venezuelan professional footballer who plays as a defensive midfielder.

Club career
Hernández's joined the San Agustin FC U-17 team and helped the club to back-to-back championships in 2009 and 2010. After a successful championship run, Hernández joined Deportivo La Guaira, then known as Real Esppor Club, and helped the U-20 team to back-to-back championships in 2011 and 2012. He made his debut for the club in 2012, appearing in the Copa Venezuela and scoring a goal.

In 2014, he moved to Portuguesa of the Venezuelan Segunda División, helping Portuguesa win the league to secure promotion to the Venezuelan Primera División He spent four years with Portuguesa before transferring to IK Frej of the Swedish Superettan. He didn't play a first team fixture in Sweden, transferring to CAI de La Chorrera of the Liga Panameña de Fútbol. After a season in Panama, Hernández returned to Venezuela and played two seasons with Aragua in 2020 and 2021.

On 9 April 2022, Hernández signed with USL League One club Chattanooga Red Wolves.

References

1993 births
Living people
Venezuelan footballers
Association football midfielders
Portuguesa F.C. players
IK Frej players
C.A. Independiente de La Chorrera players
Chattanooga Red Wolves SC players
Venezuelan Primera División players
Venezuelan Segunda División players
Liga Panameña de Fútbol players
USL League One players
Venezuelan expatriate footballers
Venezuelan expatriate sportspeople in Panama
Venezuelan expatriate sportspeople in Sweden
Venezuelan expatriate sportspeople in the United States
Expatriate footballers in Panama
Expatriate footballers in Sweden
Expatriate soccer players in the United States